Pascoe is a Cornish given name and surname which means "Easter children" from the Cornish language Pask, cognate of Latin Pascha ("Easter"). Pascoe is a Cornish pet form of the name Pascal, introduced by the Norman knights into England after the Conquest started in 1066, and derives from the Latin paschalis, which means "relating to Easter" from Latin Pascha ("Easter"). Alternative spellings are Pasco, Pascow and Pascho. Pascoe is the most common Cornish name.

"Pascoe" is also a Russian, Ukrainian and Macedonian name as it is the modern adaptation of the Slavic name "Pasko" (Macedonian: Паско; Russian or Ukrainian: Пасько) due to 18th and 19th century migration from Eastern Europe, creating the alternative Romanised spelling.

Pasco is found as surname in Australia, Canada, United Kingdom, United States and France. Pasco is also a rare Italian surname found in Northern Italy: Piedmont, Lombardy, Veneto and Tuscany. Both the Italian and the English surnames share the same Latin root and derive from the Latin word Pascha.

Notable people with this given name

Pascoe Bioletti (fl. 1913–1914), English criminal who attempted to influence the results of English football games
Pasco Bowman II (born 1933), American senior federal judge
Pascoe Charles Glyn (1833–1904), British businessman and Liberal politician
Pascoe Grenfell (1761–1838), British businessman and politician
Pascoe Grenfell Hill (1804–1882), British priest in the Church of England and an author
John Pascoe Grenfell, (1800–1869), British officer in the Brazilian Navy
William Pascoe Crook (1775–1846), British missionary, schoolmaster and pastor

Notable people with the surname Pascoe
Alan Peter Pascoe (born 1947), British athlete
B. Lynn Pascoe, Under-Secretary-General of the United Nations for Political Affairs
Bruce Pascoe (born 1947), Australian writer
Colin Pascoe (born 1965), Welsh football player
Chris Pascoe (born 1966), English humorous author
Derek Pascoe (born 1957), British musician, father of Sara
Eva Pascoe (born 1964), Polish born British internet entrepreneur
Francis Polkinghorne Pascoe (1813–1893), Cornish entomologist
George Pascoe-Watson (born 1966), British journalist
J. Ernest Pascoe (1900–1972), Canadian politician, farmer and journalist
Joaquín Gamboa Pascoe, Mexican trade union leader and politician
John Pascoe, Chief Federal Magistrate of Australia
John Pascoe Fawkner (1792–1869), Australian pioneer, businessman and politician
Keith Pascoe (born 1959), British musician and conductor
Len Pascoe (born 1950, Australian cricketer
Mal Pascoe (1933–2020), Australian footballer and coach
Matthew Pascoe (born 1977), Australian cricketer
McKenna "Bear" Pascoe (born 1986), American football player
Michael Pascoe, Australian financial journalist
Paul Pascoe (1908–1976), New Zealand architect
Peggy Pascoe (1954–2010), American professor of history and ethnic studies
Peter Pascoe (born 1953), Australian Paralympic shooter
Robert Pascoe, (born 1932), British Adjutant-General to the Forces
Russell Pascoe (1940–1963), third-last prisoner to be executed in a British prison
Sara Pascoe (born 1981), British comedian, daughter of Derek
Sophie Pascoe (born 1993), New Zealand paralympic swimmer
Thomas Pascoe (1846/48–1938), English migrant to California
Thomas Pascoe (politician) (1859–1939), member of South Australia's Legislative Council

Fictional characters
Harris Pascoe, a recurring character in the Poldark series of books and television
Peter Pascoe, in Dalziel and Pascoe, series of crime novels by Reginald Hill
also in Dalziel and Pascoe, BBC series based on the novels
Jackie Webb (née Pascoe), fictional character on television series Footballers' Wives, played by Gillian Taylforth
Kyle Pascoe, in British drama Footballers' Wives, played by Gary Lucy
Pascoe, the village pastor in Dame Ethel Smyth’s opera The Wreckers
Victor Pascow, wreck victim in Stephen King's "Pet Cemetery" .

Notable people with the surname Pasco
Crawford Atchison Denman Pasco (1818–1898) Royal Navy officer and Australian police magistrate during the 19th century, son of John Pasco
Isabelle Pasco (born 1966), French actress and model
John Pasco (1774–1853), British Admiral of Royal Navy
Merlin Owen Pasco (1892–1918), New Zealand entomologist
Richard Edward Pasco (1926–2014), British stage, screen and TV actor
Samuel Pasco (1834–1917), United States Senator from Florida

See also

Pascoe (disambiguation)
Pasko (name)

References

Cornish-language surnames
Italian-language surnames
English given names